Mandy Minella and Nina Stojanović were the defending champions, however both players chose not to participate.

Mihaela Buzărnescu and Alena Fomina won the title, defeating Lesley Kerkhove and Lidziya Marozava in the final, 6–4, 6–3.

Seeds

Draw

References
Main Draw

Al Habtoor Tennis Challenge - Doubles
2017 in Emirati tennis
Al Habtoor Tennis Challenge